The Jacksonville Expressway Authority was an independent entity established by the Florida Legislature in 1955. They owned and maintained roads and bridges in Duval County, including several toll bridges, mostly across the St. Johns River. In 1971 the Authority merged with City Coach Company and several smaller private bus companies to form the Jacksonville Transportation Authority. Tolls were removed in 1988, and the Florida Department of Transportation now maintains the bridges and freeways.

The following were built by the Expressway Authority or Transportation Authority:

Union Street Expressway and Mathews Bridge, 1952-1953
Interstate 95 from exit 348 to exit 358, including the Fuller Warren Bridge and Trout River Bridge, 1954-1960
Interstate 10 from ? to I-95, 1957-1960
Roosevelt Expressway, 1960
Arlington Expressway, 1961
Haines Street Expressway and 20th Street Expressway, 1961-1962
Southside Boulevard, 1962–63 
Hart Bridge, Hart Bridge Expressway and Emerson Expressway, 1967
J. Turner Butler Boulevard, 1972-1979
JTA Skyway, 1984–1989; phases II & III were completed in 2000
Dames Point Bridge, 1985-1989 aka Napoleon Bonaparte Broward Bridge

Tolls were charged on the Mathews Bridge, Fuller Warren Bridge, Trout River Bridge and Hart Bridge, and on J. Turner Butler Boulevard.

References

Transportation in Duval County, Florida
Toll road authorities of the United States
Government of Jacksonville, Florida
Transportation in Jacksonville, Florida
Former toll bridges in Florida
1955 establishments in Florida
1971 disestablishments in Florida